Forsinard railway station is a railway station serving the village of Forsinard in the Highland council area in the north of Scotland. It is located on the Far North Line,  from Inverness, between Kinbrace and Altnabreac. The station is managed by ScotRail, who operate the services at the station.

History 

One of the original stations was that at Forsinard.

From 1 January 1923 the station was owned by the London Midland and Scottish Railway. In September 1925, it was recorded as being  from Perth, measured via  and Inverness station. Platform 1 on the up (southbound) line can accommodate trains having four coaches, but platform 2 on the down (northbound) line can only hold three.

The station building is now used by the Royal Society for the Protection of Birds as the visitors' centre for the Forsinard Flows National Nature Reserve (which protects part of the Flow Country).

Facilities 
Both platforms have waiting areas and benches, whilst platform 2 (towards Wick) also has bike racks and a help point. There is also a small car park adjacent to platform 2. As there are no facilities to purchase tickets, passengers must buy one in advance, or from the guard on the train.

Passenger volume 

The statistics cover twelve month periods that start in April.

Services

One train per day each way calls on Sundays.

References

External links

RAILSCOT page on Forsinard

Railway stations in Sutherland
Former Highland Railway stations
Railway stations in Great Britain opened in 1874
Railway stations served by ScotRail
William Baxter railway stations
RSPB visitor centres in the United Kingdom